The killing of twins was a cultural practice among some ethnic groups in Nigeria, predominantly among the Efik people. Giving birth to twins was considered a bad omen that could bring devastation or calamity upon society. Twin babies were believed not to be humans, and were seen as evil. In some remote areas, killing of twins is believed to be a myth. In the 21st century, it is believed that killing of twins as a sacrifice still exists among those living in Nigeria's federal capital territory.

Myths and beliefs about twins 
The birth of twins was seen as an evil curse among the Efik people. Natives feared that the father of one of the babies was an evil spirit and that the mother was guilty of a grievous sin. As a result, the Efik often abandoned the twin babies in the bush. It was considered a taboo to have twins. They were perceived as unlucky and mini gods, and it is believed that evil has befallen the community or family where they were born.

Unlike the Efik, the Yoruba people saw twins to be of great importance. In the Yoruba language, twins are called "Ibeji" The Yoruba also believed that twins had supernatural powers that could increase their parents’ wealth and therefore treat them with honor. When one or both of the twins died, an Ibeji statue would be carved out in their memory. The parents would treat these statues as if they were living children by singing to them as well as feeding and caring for them. Parents that failed to take care of the Ibeji statues would suffer consequences such as poverty and illness.

Places practiced 
This practice was done in the South South and South Eastern parts of Nigeria. In the southeast, it is considered a taboo to give birth to twins. Mothers who gave birth to twins then were thought to have had intercourse with the devil's spirit resulting in the birth of something unusual or unnatural. Twins were killed or abandoned in the bush and the mothers were shunned by their husbands. The killing of newborn twins was a popular practice among the Ibibio people of Nigeria in the 19th century.

Intervention and eradication 
In 1876, Mary Slessor, a Scottish missionary was assigned to Efik Land in Calabar Nigeria. She was 28 years. She had a genuine interest in the rights and well-being of women and children. Gradually, she worked towards changing the cultural belief that twins were evil. While Mary enlightened and educated the people, she also preached the gospel of Christ. She shared a deeper bond with the people and learned their local dialect, the Efik language, and ate their locally made food. At some point, Mary started dressing like the other local women residing in the area. Without giving up her faith, she practically adopted some of the people's ways of living. However, speaking against twin killing was not a day's work as it took constant sensitization and education of those who practiced this custom. Mary was so passionate about reversing the obsolete custom that she started adopting any abandoned baby that was left to die and took care of them at the Mission House. Within a short time, she adopted eight children who became like a family to her as she continued her missionary work in more remote areas. She later succeeded in having a few converts who eventually became Christians. Mary's impact was immeasurable and in 1892, she was appointed the vice-consul of the Okoyong territory by the British Consul-general, Major Claude MacDonald. 

By 1915, twins and mothers of twins were assumed to be fully integrated into their communities. Since then, little outside attention has been given to cruelty to twins and their mothers. Rumors of recent abuse prompted a survey to be carried out from January to June 1991 among the Efik, Ibibio, and Annang peoples to determine their attitude toward twins and their mothers. The majority of the women surveyed stated that they would be happy to have twins. On the other hand, 8.9% of surveyed women considered twins taboo.

References 

Infanticide
Igbo
Efik
Twin